Benjamin Benditson (born February 16, 1983 in Tarzana, California) is an American soccer player, currently without a team.

Career

Youth and College
Benditson began playing soccer when he was five, playing club soccer for Real SoCal, and for both Oak Park High School and Milken Community High School. He played two years of college soccer at the University of Portland, and then transferred to Cal State Northridge for the 2003 and 2004 seasons. Benditson  was named his team's defensive MVP in his second and last year at Northridge.

Professional
Benditson was drafted in the first round (10th overall) of the 2005 MLS Supplemental Draft by Los Angeles Galaxy. He spent most of the 2005 season with the Galaxy's reserve team, making his first team debut when he replaced an injured Chris Albright in a 0-0 home draw against the Columbus Crew on May 26, 2005.  He missed the second half of the 2005 season through injury, and underwent surgery in Munich, Germany to repair a sports hernia in April 2006. He was waived by Galaxy on August 8, 2006.

Benditson subsequently had trials with English club Wycombe Wanderers F.C., Dutch club NEC and Danish club Viborg FF in January 2007, but was not offered a professional contract.

He joined the San Fernando Valley Quakes of the USL Premier Development League for the 2008 season, but did not feature in any games due to persistent injury, and left the team prior to the end of the season.

External links
L.A. Galaxy bio

References

1983 births
Living people
People from Tarzana, Los Angeles
American soccer players
LA Galaxy players
San Fernando Valley Quakes players
University of Portland alumni
Portland Pilots men's soccer players
Cal State Northridge Matadors men's soccer players
Major League Soccer players
LA Galaxy draft picks
Association football defenders
Soccer players from California
Sportspeople from Ventura County, California